Vladyslav Viktorovych Bukhariev (* 14 March 1969), is a Ukrainian politician and a career intelligence service officer. Bukhariev is a former people's deputy of the Ukrainian parliament who was elected parliament in the 2014 Ukrainian parliamentary election. In 2019 he served as head of the Foreign Intelligence Service of Ukraine. Avakov became an adviser to Arsen Avakov in April 2020).

Biography
Bukhariev was born in Lebedyn, Sumy Region.

In 1986–1987 he started to study at the Odessa National Academy of Telecommunications and in 1987–1992 the Kyiv Higher Military Engineering School of Signal, during which he served at the Soviet Armed Forces. In 1992, he graduated from the Kyiv Higher Military Engineering School of Signal as a communications engineer.

From 1992 to 2007 Bukhariev served as a career officer in the Security Service of Ukraine (SBU) graduating the SBU Staff Training Institute (since 1995 the SBU National Academy) in 1994.

In 2007 to 2010 he served as the First Deputy Director of the State Tax Administration — Chief of Tax Militsiya. In 2010 he was honored by the Lebedyn city council receiving a title of "Honored Citizen of Lebedyn City". In 2010–2014 Bukhariev was officially retired from the Security Service of Ukraine.

Following the Russian invasion of Ukraine in 2014, in March – July 2014 he served as the First Deputy of Director of the Security Service of Ukraine — Chief of the Main Department to combat corruption and organized crime. Yet later in 2014 Bukhariev was a special assignment officer at the Security Service. In November 2014 he was elected as a People's Deputy of Ukraine in the Verkhovna Rada in single constituency electoral district 162 situated in Okhtyrka. He won the district with 20.27% of the votes. Originally nonpartisan, Bukhariev later joined Batkivschyna parliamentary faction.

In 2018, he attended the Sumy State University and received a qualification for law.

Bukhariev was appointed Head of the Foreign Intelligence Service of Ukraine by Ukrainian president Volodymyr Zelensky on 11 June 2019. Ukrainian media outlets were quick to note that Bukhariev was awarded a medal by Russia's FSB in 2009.

Bukhariev was appointed First Deputy Head of the Security Service of Ukraine on 11 September 2019. On 11 September 2020 he was dismissed from this post. He was immediately transferred to the post (he had also held in 2014) of Deputy Director of the Security Service of Ukraine, responsible for combating corruption and organized crime. Bukhariev was dismissed from this post on 8 November 2020.

On 16 April 2020 Bukhariev was appointed advisor to Minister of Internal Affairs Arsen Avakov.

References

External  links
 
 Verkhovna Rada of Ukraine, official web portal
 Honoured citizen of Lebedyn

1969 births
Living people
People from Lebedyn
Eighth convocation members of the Verkhovna Rada
All-Ukrainian Union "Fatherland" politicians
21st-century Ukrainian politicians
Security Service of Ukraine officers
People of the Foreign Intelligence Service of Ukraine
Lieutenant generals of Ukraine
Recipients of the Order of Merit (Ukraine), 2nd class
Recipients of the Order of Merit (Ukraine), 3rd class
National Security and Defense Council of Ukraine
Laureates of the Honorary Diploma of the Verkhovna Rada of Ukraine
Recipients of the Honorary Diploma of the Cabinet of Ministers of Ukraine
Sumy State University alumni